Triacetonamine is an organic compound with the formula OC(CH2CMe2)2NH (where Me = CH3).  It is a colorless or white solid that melts near room temperature.  The compound is an intermediate in the preparation of 2,2,6,6-tetramethylpiperidine, a sterically hindered base and precursor to the reagent called TEMPO.  Triacetonamine is formed by the poly-aldol condensation of acetone in the presence of ammonia and calcium chloride:
3 (CH3)2CO  +  NH3  →   OC(CH2CMe2)2NH  +  2 H2O

Reductive amination of triacetonamine gives 4-amino-2,2,6,6-tetramethylpiperidine.

It is primarily used as a stabilizer for plastics, typically via its conversion to number of hindered amine light stabilizers, but also finds use as a chemical feedstock. It is used to prepare the hindered amine 2,2,6,6-tetramethylpiperidine, CH2[CH2C(CH3)2]2NH, as well as the radical oxidizer 4-Hydroxy-TEMPO.

References

Piperidines
Cyclic ketones